Luciano Soli (12 October 1937 – 5 November 2014) was an Italian field hockey player. He competed in the men's tournament at the 1960 Summer Olympics in Rome.

References

External links
 

1937 births
2014 deaths
Italian male field hockey players
Olympic field hockey players of Italy
Field hockey players at the 1960 Summer Olympics
Sportspeople from Rome